The 2013 G20 Saint Petersburg summit was the eighth meeting of the G20 heads of government/heads of state. The hosting venue was the Constantine Palace in Saint Petersburg, Russia, on 5–6 September 2013.

Syria

The summit was dominated by questions regarding the Syrian civil war and any potential international reaction to the Ghouta chemical attacks. The summit came after U.S.-led efforts to obtain a UN Security Council resolution authorising military strikes against the Assad government had failed due to Russian and Chinese opposition. The House of Commons of the United Kingdom had defeated a motion regarding UK involvement in any strike on 30 August and U.S. politicians were debating potential action as the summit was ongoing.

Media billed the summit as a contest between U.S. President Barack Obama, trying to garner support for military action, and Russian President Vladimir Putin in opposition to any such action. 11 countries signed a U.S.-authored statement blaming and condemning the Assad government for the attacks and calling for a "strong international response".

Finance policy meetings
Russia, as this year's chair, hosted the G20 finance ministers and central bank governors' meeting in Moscow on 15 and 16 February 2013. While preparing for the September summit, the most pressing subject addressed – "desperately" according to Canadian Finance Minister Jim Flaherty – was protectionist actions such as competitive devaluations. Japan, represented by finance minister Taro Aso, "escape[d] criticism" for the 20% drop in the yen that had stemmed from its recent reflationary policies. The "nations declared ... there would be no currency war and deferred plans to set new debt-cutting targets, underlining broad concern about the fragile state of the world economy", per Reuters.

Another meeting of the same participants was held in Moscow on 18 and 19 April 2013.

Attendance

This meeting was the second time an Australian Prime Minister could not be in attendance, with Kevin Rudd being represented by Foreign Minister Bob Carr, owing to the timing of a federal election on 7 September. In 2010, Rudd had been unable to attend when he was displaced as prime minister two days before the 2010 G20 Toronto summit, at which Deputy Prime Minister Wayne Swan then represented Australia. 
During the summit, Indian Prime Minister Manmohan Singh focused on the ongoing economic crisis and urged the G20 nations to pay more attention to their monetary policies.

After a suggestion by South African President Zuma to invite additional representatives from African nations to St Petersburg, Russia's President Vladimir Putin declared that he appreciates this suggestion, and is ready to welcome leaders from the African Union and the New Partnership for Africa’s Development (NEPAD) to the G20 summit in St Petersburg.

Participating leaders

Invited guests

References

External links

Official Site
G20 website of the OECD
Full Text of India Prime Minister Manmohan Singh's Speech at St. Petersburg G20 Summit 
Joint Statement on Syria by 11 signatories

2013 conferences
2013 in international relations
G-20 Saint Petersburg summit
21st-century diplomatic conferences (Global)
Diplomatic conferences in Russia
2013
September 2013 events in Russia